Dilkusha Guest House is a government-owned guest house located in Hyderabad, Telangana, India. It is located adjacent to Raj Bhavan. It is a notified heritage structure in Hyderabad. It is used as a state guest house.

References

Hyderabad State
Heritage structures in Hyderabad, India
Palaces in Hyderabad, India